The following have been mayors of Chichester, Sussex:

William Combe 1390–91 MP for Chichester, 1382, 1384 and 1401
William Neel 1393–95, 1401–02 MP for Chichester, 1388, 1399 and 1415.
William Horlebat 1398–99. MP for Chichester, 1388
Thomas Patching 1407–08 MP for Chichester, 1486–1499
William Hore 1422–23, 1427–29, 1432–33, 1436–37, 1439–40, 1444–45, 1446–48. MP for Chichester, 1420 and 1431
John Digons 1548–49  MP for Chichester, 1554
Richard Knight 1554–55  MP for Chichester, 1555
John Digons 1556–57 and 1567–68
Lawrence Ardren 1564  MP for Chichester, 1558
 Charles Lennox, 2nd Duke of Richmond 1735–36 
 Lord George Lennox 1772–73 
 Charles Buckner 1783–84
 Sir George Murray 1815 Vice-admiral, Royal Navy
 R. C. Miller 1900
 Leslie Evershed-Martin 1955–57 Founder of Chichester Festival Theatre
 1969 S.J Watson

21st century
Source:List of Mayors of Chichester
 Peggie Frost 2000–01
 Michael Shone 2001–02
 David Siggs 2002–03
 Jean E. Le Bourlier-Woods 2003–04
 Michael Shone 2004–05
 Richard E. Plowman 2005–06
 J. Rob Campling 2006–07
 Raymond E. Brown 2007–08
 David Siggs 2008–09
 Michael Woolley 2009–11
 Anthony J. French 2011–12
 Anne Scicluna 2012–13
Alan Chaplin  2013  (resigned December 2013 and replaced by John F Hughes
John F Hughes 2014–15
Peter Budge 2015–16

References
 List of Mayors of Chichester

Lists of mayors